Makkalai Petra Magarasi is a 1957 Indian Tamil-language film starring Sivaji Ganesan and P. Bhanumathi. The film was remade in Kannada as Anna Thangi.

Plot 
A village in Coimbatore district. Sengodan is a naïve good-hearted farmer, who knows no other God other than his mother Angamma. Staying back in the hamlet and tilling his land, he sends his beloved sister Thangam to the college in the town. Angamma's brother is an avaricious landowner in the same village. The two families are not in speaking terms ever since Angamma's husband ran away unable to meet the unreasonable demands of his brother-in-law after having borrowed some money from him. Kannan, the villain's son, however does not inherit his father's wily characteristics. Studying in the same college, Kannan and Thangam fall in love with each other. The storm which breaks out when the warring families become aware of their love and the how the lovers unite finally fill rest of the reels. In the midst of these chaotic proceedings there is also another love story between the brave and mischievous belle Rangamma and the shy Sengodan.

Cast 
Sivaji Ganesan as Sengodan
P. Bhanumathi as Rangamma
P. Kannamba as Angamma
M. N. Nambiar as Kannan
M. N. Rajam as  Thangam
V. K. Ramasamy as Pannaiyar / Kannan's father
K. Sarangapani as Rangamma's father
E. R. Sahadevan as Mayandi
P. D. Sambandam as Kaaduvetti Kanakkupillai
V. M. Ezhumalai as Pavala malai
T. P. Muthulakshmi as Pavayee
C. T. Rajakantham as Akhilandam
 M. R. Santhanam

Soundtrack 
The music composed by K. V. Mahadevan. Lyrics were written by A. Maruthakasi, Thanjai N. Ramaiah Dass, Ka. Mu. Sheriff & Pattukkottai Kalyanasundaram. The song "Manapaarai Maadu Katti" is set to Sindhu Bhairavi raga.

References

External links 
 

1950s Tamil-language films
1957 films
Films directed by K. Somu
Films scored by K. V. Mahadevan
Films with screenplays by A. P. Nagarajan
Tamil films remade in other languages